Handelsmän och partisaner (lit. Merchants and Partisans) is the eight novel by Swedish author Klas Östergren. It was published in 1991.

References

External links

1991 Swedish novels
Novels by Klas Östergren
Swedish-language novels
Novels set in Scania
Albert Bonniers Förlag books